Vessey may refer to:

Vessey, Manche, French commune

People
John William Vessey, Jr. (1922–2016), United States Army general
Maggie Vessey (born 1981), American middle distance runner
Robert S. Vessey (1858–1929), American politician
Robert Vessey (Canadian politician) (born 1961), Canadian politician
Tricia Vessey (born 1972), American actress
Tony Vessey (born 1961), English footballer

See also
Vessey House (disambiguation)

English-language surnames